Varuq (also Romanized as Varūq, Ūrūq, Vorūq, and Warūq; also known as Varagh and Varaq) is a village in Shahidabad Rural District, Central District, Avaj County, Qazvin Province, Iran. At the 2006 census, its population was 410, in 94 families.

References 

Populated places in Avaj County